Armenian Earthquake Memorial Day is a day of remembrance in Armenia for the earthquake of magnitude 6.9 on the Richter scale that struck in northwest Armenia (then part of the Soviet Union) on 7 December 1988. The earthquake damaged much of the country's infrastructure, especially in the cities of Spitak, Leninakan (now Gyumri), Kirovakan (now Vanadzor), and Stepanavan, along with other small towns and villages near the epicenter.

Each year, 7 December is recognized by the government of Armenia (and the de facto government of Nagorno-Karabakh) as a day of remembrance of the tragedies that stemmed from the earthquake in 1988.

References 

Public holidays in Armenia
Remembrance days
Public holidays in the Republic of Artsakh